DZEC-TV (channel 25) is a television station in Metro Manila, Philippines, serving as the flagship of Net 25. Owned and operated by the Eagle Broadcasting Corporation, the station maintains studios at the EBC Building, #25 Central Ave., New Era, Quezon City, and its hybrid analog and digital transmitter facility is located at Milton Hills Subdivision, Brgy. New Era, Quezon City (sharing facilities with INC TV 48 and Eagle FM 95.5).

As of October 1, 2018, the station's analog signal closed down, but on April 7, 2022, they resumed on-air until the NTC orders a shutdown of analog TV in the country by the end of 2023.

Network statistics
The station operated at 50 kilowatts analog transmitter power output & 150kW ERP due to its network stability. They use JAMPRO 48-panel antenna and two 60kW Acrodyne transmitters with 120 kilowatts of transmitter power (for a total of 7,896 kilowatts ERP) however, it operates only at 50 kilowatts TPO, as of 2011. In October 2018, the station temporarily shut down its analog signal in favor of Digital terrestrial TV broadcast. However, in April 7, 2022, it returned on-air on its analog broadcast after 3-year hiatus.

Digital television

Digital channels 

DZEC-TV broadcasts its digital signal on UHF Channel 28 (557.143MHz)  and is multiplexed into the following subchannels:

In addition, Eagle Broadcasting Corporation operates its channel on DZCE-TV UHF Channel 49 (683.143MHz)

Analog-to-digital conversion 
From September 7, 2017, in time for its 8th year since INC's Executive Minister Eduardo Manalo entered office, INCTV was granted a "special authority" from the National Telecommunications Commission to move its analog feed from UHF Channel 49 to UHF Channel 48 to allow the former channel to simulcast digitally in full-time, which began two days earlier (September 5). The shift was arranged for the station until its management announced its intention to permanently shut down analog broadcasts and go digital-only.

As of October 1, 2018, Net 25 closed its analog TV signal, until April 7, 2022, when it resumed on-air.

As of October 2021, NET 25 has started its Digital Terrestrial TV (DTT) broadcasts in selected areas of Metro Manila on UHF channel 28 (557.143 MHz). On January 29, 2022, NET 25's Digital Terrestrial TV transmitter power suddenly increased from 500 watts to 5kW. On April 27, 2022, it further received a signal increase to 10kW transmitter power.

Areas of coverage

Primary areas 
 Metro Manila 
 Cavite
 Bulacan
 Laguna
 Rizal

Secondary areas 
 Portion of Bataan
 Pampanga
 Portion of Nueva Ecija
 Portion of Tarlac
 Portion of Zambales
 Portion of Batangas
 Portion of Quezon

See also
Eagle Broadcasting Corporation
Net 25
Eagle FM 95.5
INC TV
DZEC Radyo Agila 1062

References

External links
Net-25 Official Website

Television stations in Metro Manila
Television channels and stations established in 1999
1999 establishments in the Philippines
Digital television stations in the Philippines